UER may refer to:

 European Broadcasting Union (Union européenne de radio-télévision)
  (Università Europea di Roma), an Italian Catholic university
 United to End Racism, campaigning organisation
 Union of Romanian Jews (Uniunea Evreilor Români)

See also
 Uèr